Comstock-Cheney Hall, also known as Ivoryton Playhouse, is a theater building located in the village of Ivoryton in the town of Essex, Connecticut, US. It is listed in the National Register of Historic Places. The theatre is believed to be the first continuously operating summer theatre in the United States.

Construction 
Construction began in 1910 and was completed 1911 as a recreation hall for the Comstock-Cheney factory. The building includes Classical Revival architecture.

Theatre 
The theatre is believed to be the first self-supporting summer theatre in the United States. Although there were older theatres in Dennis, MA and Skowhegan, ME, they were endowed by foundations of wealthy families and not self-supporting. The Westport Country Playhouse was established one year after the Ivoryton Playhouse.

The Playhouse is on the National Register of Historic Places, as is indicated on the front of the building.

See also
National Register of Historic Places listings in Middlesex County, Connecticut

References

External links
 Ivoryton Playhouse Official website

Essex, Connecticut
Theatres in Connecticut
Tourist attractions in Middlesex County, Connecticut
Buildings and structures in Middlesex County, Connecticut
Neoclassical architecture in Connecticut
Theatres completed in 1911
National Register of Historic Places in Middlesex County, Connecticut
Theatres on the National Register of Historic Places in Connecticut
1911 establishments in Connecticut